Theatre Bay Area (TBA) is a non-profit organization, founded in 1976, whose mission is to unite, strengthen and promote the theatre community in the San Francisco Bay Area, working on behalf of their conviction that the performing arts are an essential public good, critical to a healthy and truly democratic society, and invaluable as a source of personal enrichment and growth.

TBA was founded to serve San Francisco's vital artistic community, and is today the largest regional theatre service organization in North America, serving as a model for other service organizations around the country.

The San Francisco Bay Area is the third largest theatre center in the country, with more than 400 companies in 12 counties. The region has more theatre companies per capita than almost any other metropolitan area in the U.S. and is home to the third largest community of Equity (union) actors, following New York City and Chicago. Some 200 new plays are premiered in San Francisco each year, many going on to wider success.

Theatre Bay Area's present membership is derived from 12 Bay Area counties (the 9 counties plus Santa Cruz, Monterey, and San Joaquin counties) and consists of more than 365 Bay Area theatre and dance companies, from multimillion-dollar organizations to grassroots community groups; some 3,000 individuals, including actors, directors, designers, playwrights, technicians and theatre patrons; and more than 100 organizational members, from libraries and universities to theatre industry professional services.

Theatre Bay Area's most prominent programs include TIX Bay Area (“online or in line” ticketing services), Theatre Bay Area magazine (the central source for information on the Bay Area's theatre community), numerous re-granting programs for emerging theatre companies and local theatre artists, their Web site containing comprehensive theatre listings available in the Bay Area, and advocacy for the theatre and dance community on the local, state, and national level.

TIX Bay Area 
TIX Bay Area is walk-up box office selling half-price and full price theater tickets on the day of performance or in advance to select events. TIX is located on Union Square, San Francisco, California in the heart of San Francisco's premier shopping and hotel district.

Theatre Bay Area Magazine 
The first issue, a mimeographed single page, appeared in January 1976 (it took the name Callboard four months later). The single page turned into a couple of stapled pages. In September 1987, under Theatre Bay Area's executive director and Callboard managing editor Deborah Allen, the publication grew to a 7-inch-by-11-inch format.

In 1987, one color was added. The September 1988 issue was Jean Schiffman's first as editor (she was previously the organization's communications director, and before that a publications associate). Belinda Taylor became editor in June 1993 and by October 1993 had completely redesigned the magazine, inside and out. The result is the roughly 8.5-inch-by-11-inch magazine Theatre Bay Area Magazine has today.

Finally the name Callboard was changed to Theatre Bay Area Magazine in January 2004 in an attempt to more accurately reflect its content.  Not only does the magazine have up to date audition listings that Callboard got its start publishing in 1976, but it also covers several stories and articles about the whole Bay Area theatre scene and theatre in general.

External links 
 Theatre Bay Area
 TIX Bay Area
 Theatre Bay Area Magazine

Theatrical organizations in the United States
Non-profit organizations based in San Francisco
Theatre in San Francisco